Lionel de Tinguy du Pouët (6 April 19119 September 1981) was a French politician.

Early life
Lionel de Tinguy du Pouët was born on 6 April 1911 in Paris. His father, Jean de Tinguy du Pouët, was a politician.

Tinguy graduated from the École Polytechnique and the Sciences Po, and he also earned a law degree.

Career
Tinguy served as a member of the National Assembly representing Vendée from 1946 to 1958, and from 1962 to 1967. He was the Minister of Merchant Marine from July 2, 1950 to July 12, 1950. He also served as a member of the French Senate from 1977 to 1981.

Death
Tinguy died on 9 September 1981 in Neuilly-sur-Seine near Paris.

References

1911 births
1981 deaths
Politicians from Paris
Popular Republican Movement politicians
Centre of Social Democrats politicians
Union for French Democracy politicians
French Ministers of Merchant Marine
Members of the Constituent Assembly of France (1946)
Deputies of the 1st National Assembly of the French Fourth Republic
Deputies of the 2nd National Assembly of the French Fourth Republic
Deputies of the 3rd National Assembly of the French Fourth Republic
Deputies of the 2nd National Assembly of the French Fifth Republic
French Senators of the Fifth Republic
Senators of Vendée
École Polytechnique alumni
Sciences Po alumni